Jonas Pettersson better known as Juvelen (English: The Jewel), (born July 15, 1976) is an electro-pop singer from Stockholm, Sweden. Jonas Pettersson was previously a member of the indie pop band Pine Forest Crunch in the 1990s and the synthpop band Camera in the early 2000s. His music has been described as "electronic falsetto pop with a fragrance of soul music". His music is influenced by Prince, amongst others.

The song They Don't Love You from his debut album 1 features in the Samsung Tocco Ultra advert.

Discography

Album
 2007: Juvelen (Hybris)
 2008: 1 (Hybris)

EPs
 2008: Don't Mess (Hybris)
 2011: Make U Move (Hybris)

Singles
 2007: Watch Your Step
 2008: Private Dancer – Rocca feat. Juvelen (Every Conversation Records, Tokyo)
 2009: They Don't Love You
 2010: All-Time High (Whisper)
 2012: For Only U (Hybris)

References

External links
Official website
Juvelen on MySpace

1976 births
Living people
21st-century Swedish singers
21st-century Swedish male singers